MMP may refer to:

Computing and video games
 Massively multi-player, a type of online game
 Massively multiprocessing, large symmetric multiprocessing (SMP) computer systems
 Measure Map Pro format, a GIS format

Science and mathematics
 Matrix metalloproteinase enzymes
 Methuselah Mouse Prize, for research into slowing cellular ageing
 Millennium Mathematics Project, of the University of Cambridge
 Moscow Mathematical Papyrus, an ancient Egyptian mathematical papyrus
 Matrilysin, an enzyme
  Minimal model program, a branch of birational geometry
 Million progressive motile (million motile sperm cells per milliliter), a measure of male fertility used in semen analysis

Politics
 Mixed-member proportional representation, a voting system used in Germany, New Zealand and other countries
 Manitoba Marijuana Party, now Freedom Party of Manitoba, a Canadian political party
 Minuteman Project, 2005 action to deter illegal immigration
 Molotov–Ribbentrop Pact, was a non-aggression pact signed in Moscow in the late hours of 23 August 1939

Industry and labor
 International Organization of Masters, Mates & Pilots (MM&P), a maritime labor union
 Moldova Metallurgical Plant, see Moldova Steel Works
 Maintenance management professional, a Canadian job qualification

Sport
 Memphis Motorsports Park, a race track in Millington, Tennessee, United States
 Minute Maid Park, a ballpark in Houston, Texas, United States
 Miller Motorsports Park in Tooele County, Utah.

Fiction
 Mass market paperback, a bookbinding format
 Tokyo Mew Mew, also known as Mew Mew Power, a Japanese cartoon
 Miss Moneypenny, secretary to James Bond's boss
 Mighty Math Powers, a method that Team Umizoomi uses

Others
 Magellan Midstream Partners, a publicly traded partnership
 Marian Movement of Priests, a Catholic organization
 Multi-Man Publishing, a wargame company
 Metal Mind Productions, a Polish music label
 Monday Morning Podcast, a weekly comedy podcast by Bill Burr
 Marchwood Military Port, a Military Port in Marchwood, England
 Missile Moyenne Portée (MMP), a French anti-tank missile
 Mucous membrane pemphigoid
 Marilyn Monroe Productions